Amelia Peabody, born July 3, 1890, in Marblehead, Massachusetts, died May 31, 1984, in Dover, Massachusetts was an American millionaire,  philanthropist, breeder and sculptor.

Peabody studied sculpture at the School of the Museum of Fine Arts under Charles Grafly, eventually becoming a recognized sculptor.

At her farms Powisset Farm and Mills Farm in Dover, she raised registered Hereford cattle, Yorkshire pigs, sheep and thoroughbred horses.

For many years she chaired the Arts and Skills Service of the American Red Cross, which promoted art therapy for wounded servicemen during World War II.

On her property, in 1948 she financed the construction of one of the world's first solar-heated houses, the Dover Sun House.

Amelia Peabody died on May 1, 1984, at her farm of natural causes, leaving the bulk of her large estate to charity.

References

External links
Amelia Peabody Foundation
Image of Amelia Peabody in her studio.

1890 births
1984 deaths
American sculptors
20th-century American sculptors
People from Marblehead, Massachusetts
American philanthropists
School of the Museum of Fine Arts at Tufts alumni